Ivan Uhliarik (born 3 June 1968 in Námestovo) is a Slovak Physician and politician for the Christian Democratic Movement and served from 8 June 2010 until 4 April 2012 as Minister of Health in the Cabinet of Iveta Radičová.

References 

1968 births
Living people
People from Námestovo
Charles University alumni
Christian Democratic Movement politicians
Health ministers of Slovakia
20th-century Slovak physicians
Members of the National Council (Slovakia) 2012-2016